Soda Fountain Shuffle is the 12th studio album by Earl Klugh released in 1985. This is the first album which Klugh recorded for Warner Bros. Records. Unlike his other albums where Klugh is accompanied by full orchestras, in this release, Klugh is backed by a 6-man band. The album contains "10 original Klugh instrumentals balancing his subtle and soft playing against a full range of electronic accompaniment".

Track listing 
"Just Pretend" – 3:40
"Baby Cakes" – 3:34
"Soda Fountain Shuffle" – 3:18
"Moonlight Dancing" – 4:41
"Incognito" – 4:35
"One Night (Alone With You)" – 4:34
"Some Other Time" – 3:39
"Rainbow Man" – 5:22
"Close to Your Heart" – 5:04
"April Love" – 3:34

Charts

References 

1985 albums
Earl Klugh albums
Warner Records albums